Lyckoslanten (Swedish: Lucky Penny) is a free quarterly children's magazine based in Stockholm, Sweden. It has been in circulation since 1926.

History and profile
Lyckoslanten was started by Sparbankerna (Savings Banks Association) in 1926. The first issue appeared on 30 October 1926. The magazine is owned by Swedbank and Sparbankerna. It was formerly distributed by Postsparbanken. It is published by Vi Media AB on a quarterly basis. Its headquarters is in Stockholm. One of the early directors was Erik Elinder who served in the post until 1950.

Lyckoslanten is a free magazine and is sent to Swedish school children attending the grades of 4–6. The goal of the magazine is to improve children's inclination to thrift and their financial literacy skills. It also encourages children to think about how they use their allowance. It covers funny comics, competitions and tips. The magazine has published several comic strip series, including Spara och Slösa. It was featured in the magazine from its start in 1926 to 1963 as part of the savings campaigns.

In 1957 Lyckoslanten enjoyed the highest level of circulation.

References

External links
  

1926 establishments in Sweden
Education magazines
Free magazines
Humor magazines
Magazines established in 1926
Magazines published in Stockholm
Children's magazines published in Sweden
Comics magazines published in Sweden
Swedish-language magazines
Quarterly magazines published in Sweden
Personal finance education